The military history of African Americans spans from the arrival of the first enslaved Africans during the colonial history of the United States to the present day. In every war fought by or within the United States, African Americans participated, including the Revolutionary War, the War of 1812, the Mexican–American War, the Civil War, the Spanish–American War, World War I, World War II, the Korean War, the Vietnam War, the Gulf War, the War in Afghanistan, and the Iraq War.

Revolutionary War 

African Americans, both  as slaves and freemen, served on both sides of the Revolutionary War. Gary Nash reports that recent research concludes there were about 9,000 black soldiers who served on the American side, counting the Continental Army and Navy, state militia units, as well as privateers, wagoneers in the Army, servants, officers and spies. Ray Raphael notes that while thousands did join the Loyalist cause, "A far larger number, free as well as slave, tried to further their interests by siding with the patriots."

Black soldiers served in Northern militias from the outset, but this was forbidden in the South, where slave-owners feared arming slaves. Lord Dunmore, the Royal Governor of Virginia, issued an emancipation proclamation in November 1775, promising freedom to runaway slaves who fought for the British; Sir Henry Clinton issued a similar edict in New York in 1779. Over 100,000 slaves escaped to British lines, although only roughly 1,000 served on the front lines. Many Black Loyalist migrated to Nova Scotia and later to Sierra Leone. Many of the Black Loyalists performed military service in the British Army, particularly as part of the only Black regiment of the war, the Black Pioneers, and others served non-military roles.

In response, and because of manpower shortages, Washington lifted the ban on black enlistment in the Continental Army in January 1776. All-black units were formed in Rhode Island and Massachusetts; many were slaves promised freedom for serving in lieu of their masters; another all-African-American unit came from Haiti with French forces. At least 5,000 African-American soldiers fought as Revolutionaries, and at least 20,000 served with the British.

Peter Salem and Salem Poor are the most noted of the African-American Patriots during this era, and Colonel Tye was perhaps the most noteworthy Black Loyalist.

African Americans also served with various of the South Carolina guerrilla units, including that of the "Swamp Fox", Francis Marion, half of whose force sometimes consisted of free Blacks. These Black troops made a critical difference in the fighting in the swamps, and kept Marion's guerrillas effective even when many of his white troops were down with malaria or yellow fever.

The first black American to fight in the Marines was John Martin, also known as Keto, the slave of a Delaware man, recruited in April 1776 without his owner's permission by Captain of the Marines Miles Pennington of the Continental brig USS Reprisal. Martin served with the Marine platoon on the Reprisal for a year and a half and took part in many ship-to-ship battles including boardings with hand-to-hand combat, but he was lost with the rest of his unit when the brig sank in October 1777. At least 12 other black men served with various American Marine units in 1776–1777; more may have been in service but not identified as blacks in the records. However, in 1798 when the United States Marine Corps (USMC) was officially re-instituted, Secretary of War James McHenry specified in its rules: "No Negro, Mulatto or Indian to be enlisted". Marine Commandant William Ward Burrows instructed his recruiters regarding USMC racial policy, "You can make use of Blacks and Mulattoes while you recruit, but you cannot enlist them." The policy was formulated to set a higher standard of unit cohesion for Marines, with the unit to be made up of only one race, so that the members would remain loyal, maintain shipboard discipline and help put down mutinies. The USMC maintained this policy until 1942.

War of 1812 

During the War of 1812, about one-quarter of the personnel in the American naval squadrons of the Battle of Lake Erie were black, and portrait renderings of the battle on the wall of the nation's Capitol and the rotunda of Ohio's Capitol show that blacks played a significant role in it. Hannibal Collins, a freed slave and Oliver Hazard Perry's personal servant, is thought to be the oarsman in William Henry Powell's Battle of Lake Erie. Collins earned his freedom as a veteran of the Revolutionary War, having fought in the Battle of Rhode Island. He accompanied Perry for the rest of Perry's naval career, and was with him at Perry's death in Trinidad in 1819.

No legal restrictions regarding the enlistment of blacks were placed on the Navy because of its chronic shortage of manpower. The law of 1792, which generally prohibited enlistment of blacks in the Army became the United States Army's official policy until 1862. The only exception to this Army policy was Louisiana, which gained an exemption at the time of its purchase through a treaty provision, which allowed it to opt out of the operation of any law, which ran counter to its traditions and customs. Louisiana permitted the existence of separate black militia units which drew its enlistees from freed blacks.

A militia unit, In Louisiana, the 2nd Battalion of Free Men of Color, was a unit of black soldiers from Santo Domingo led by a Black free man and Santo-Domingue emigre Joseph Savary offered their services and were accepted by General Andrew Jackson in the Battle of New Orleans, a victory that was achieved after the war was officially over.

Blacks fought at the Battle of Bladensburg August 24, 1814,  many as members of Commodore Joshua Barney's naval flotilla force. This force provided crucial artillery support during the battle. One of the best accounts is that by Charles Ball (born 1785). Ball served with Commodore Joshua at the Battle of Bladensburg and later helped man the defenses at Baltimore. In his 1837 memoir, Ball reflected on the Battle of Bladensburg: "I stood at my gun, until the Commodore was shot down… if the militia regiments, that lay upon our right and left, cold have been brought to charge the British, in close fight, as they crossed the bridge, we should have killed or taken the whole of them in a short time; but the militia ran like sheep chased by dogs." Barney's flotilla group included numerous African Americans who provided artillery support during the battle.  Modern scholars estimate blacks made up between 15 and 20%, of the American naval forces in the War of 1812.

Just before the battle Commodore Barney on being asked by President James Madison "if his negroes would not run on the approach of the British?" replied: "No Sir…they don't know how to run; they will die by their guns first." The Commodore was correct, the men did not run, one such man was young sailor Harry Jones (no.35), apparently a free black.  Harry Jones was wounded in the final action at Bladensburg. Due to the severity of Jones wounds, he remained a patient at the Naval Hospital Washington DC for nearly two months.

African Americans also served with the British. On April 2, 1814, Vice Admiral Alexander Cochrane issued a proclamation to all persons wishing to emigrate, similar to the aforementioned Dunmore's Proclamation some 40 years previous. Any persons would be received by the British, either at a military outpost or aboard British ships; those seeking sanctuary could enter His Majesty's forces, or go "as free settlers to the British possessions in North America or the West Indies". Among those who went to the British, some joined the Corps of Colonial Marines, an auxiliary unit of marine infantry, embodied on May 14, 1814. British commanders later stated the new marines fought well at Bladensburg and confirm that two companies took part in the burning of Washington including the White House. Following the Treaty of Ghent, the British kept their promise and in 1815 evacuated the Colonial Marines and their families to Halifax Canada and Bermuda.

1815 to 1840 

"Despite Southern attempts to restrict their movements with the Negro Seaman Acts, African American sailors continued to enlist in the Navy in substantial numbers throughout the 1820s and 1830s." From the Treaty of Ghent to the Mexican-American War, African Americans made up a significant part of the peacetime navy.Data collected by Dr. Elnathan Judson USN, for his 1823 report, to the Secretary of the Navy,contains detailed information re the number of seamen vaccinated in the Boston area. This report which covers four months listed 161 men and boys of which, Dr. Judson enumerated 30 as black or 18.7% of the total.   Commodore William Bainbridge  in a 14 September 1827 letter to Secretary of the Navy Samuel L. Southhard, reported 102 men had been received from the Philadelphia area of which 18 were Black or 17.6%. Bainbridge concluded by informing the Southard "I ordered the Recruiting Officer not to enter anymore until further notice."    Data for 1839 was collected by Commodore Lewis Warrington and forwarded to the Secretary of  the Navy as a memorandum with the number of recruits from 1 September 1838 to September 17, 1839. This document provides data for five naval recruiting stations which in total reflect 1016 men entered or naval service, "of which 122 were Black" or 12% of the total.

Mexican–American War 
A number of African Americans in the Army during the Mexican–American War were servants of the officers who received government compensation for the services of their servants or slaves. Also, soldiers from the Louisiana Battalion of Free Men of Color participated in this war. African Americans also served on a number of naval vessels during the Mexican–American War, including the USS Treasure, and the USS Columbus.

The involvement of African Americans in this war was one where they were not included as actual soldiers. There were however, a few cases of African Americans joining in the fighting and these people became known as "Black Toms". Many slaves that were brought into assist the army officers escaped to Mexico. However, whenever the American Army would encounter these African Americans they viewed them as stolen property and dissolved them back into the racial hierarchy of the army.

American Civil War 

The history of African Americans in the U.S. Civil War is marked by 186,097 (7,122 officers, 178,975 enlisted) African-American men, comprising 163 units, who served in the Union Army during the Civil War, and many more African Americans served in the Union Navy. Both free African Americans and runaway slaves joined the fight.

On the Confederate side, blacks, both free and slave, were used for labor. In the final months of the war, the Confederate Army was desperate for additional soldiers so the Confederate Congress voted to recruit black troops for combat; they were to be promised their freedom. Units were in training when the war ended, and none served in combat.

54th Massachusetts Infantry Regiment

Indian Wars 

From 1863 to the early 20th century, African-American units were utilized by the Army to combat the Native Americans during the Indian Wars. The most noted among this group were the Buffalo Soldiers:
 9th Cavalry Regiment
 10th Cavalry Regiment
 24th Infantry Regiment
 25th Infantry Regiment

At the end of the U.S. Civil War the army reorganized and authorized the formation of two regiments of black cavalry (the 9th and 10th US Cavalry). Four regiments of infantry (the 38th, 39th, 40th and 41st US Infantry) were formed at the same time. In 1869, the four infantry regiments were merged into two new ones (the 24th and 25th US Infantry). These units were composed of black enlisted men commanded by white officers such as Benjamin Grierson, and occasionally, an African-American officer such as Henry O. Flipper. The "Buffalo Soldiers" served a variety of roles along the frontier from building roads to guarding the U.S. mail.

These regiments served at a variety of posts in the southwest United States and Great Plains regions. During this period they participated in most of the military campaigns in these areas and earned a distinguished record. Thirteen enlisted men and six officers from these four regiments earned the Medal of Honor during the Indian Wars.

Spanish–American War 

After the Indian Wars ended in the 1890s, the regiments continued to serve and participated in the Spanish–American War (including the Battle of San Juan Hill), where five more Medals of Honor were earned. They took part in the 1916 Punitive Expedition into Mexico and in the Philippine–American War.

Units 
In addition to the African Americans who served in regular army units during the Spanish–American War, five African-American Volunteer Army units and seven African-American National Guard units served.

Volunteer Army:
 7th United States Volunteer Infantry (Colored Troops)
 8th United States Volunteer Infantry (Colored Troops)
 9th United States Volunteer Infantry (Colored Troops)
 10th United States Volunteer Infantry (Colored Troops)
 11th United States Volunteer Infantry (Colored Troops)

National Guard:
 3rd Alabama Volunteer Infantry (Colored Troops)
 8th Illinois Volunteer Infantry (Colored Troops)
 Companies A and B, 1st Indiana Volunteer Infantry (Colored Troops)
 23rd Kansas Volunteer Infantry (Colored Troops)
 3rd North Carolina Volunteer Infantry (Colored Troops)
 9th Ohio Volunteer Infantry (Colored Troops)
 6th Virginia Volunteer Infantry (Colored Troops)

Of these units, only the 9th U.S., 8th Illinois, and 23rd Kansas served outside the United States during the war. All three units served in Cuba and suffered no losses to combat.

Philippine–American War 
After the Treaty of Paris, the islands of the Philippines became a colony of the United States. When the U.S. military started to send soldiers into the islands, native rebels, who had already been fighting their former Spanish rulers, opposed U.S. colonization and retaliated, causing an insurrection. In what would be known as the Philippine–American War, the U.S. military also sent colored regiments and units to stop the insurrection. However, due to the discrimination of African-American soldiers, some of them defected to the Philippine Army.

One of those that defected was David Fagen, who was given the rank of captain in the Philippine Army. Fagen served in the 24th Regiment of the U.S. Army, but on November 17, 1899, he defected to the Filipino army. He became a successful guerrilla leader and his capture became an obsession to the U.S. military and American public. His defection was likely the result of differential treatment by American occupational forces toward black soldiers, as well as common American forces derogatory treatment and views of the Filipino occupational resistance, who were frequently referred to as "niggers" and "gugus".

After two other black deserters were captured and executed, President Theodore Roosevelt announced he would stop executing captured deserters. As the war ended, the US gave amnesties to most of their opponents. A substantial reward was offered for Fagen, who was considered a traitor. There are two conflicting versions of his fate: one is that his was the partially decomposed head for which the reward was claimed, the other is that he took a local wife and lived peacefully in the mountains.

World War I and Interwar Period

When the war broke out, several African-Americans joined Allied armies. Most notably, Eugene Bullard and Bob Scanlon joined the French Foreign Legion within weeks of the start of the war.  Of the twelve African-Americans who joined the Legion at the start, only two survived the war.

The U.S. armed forces remained segregated through World War I as a matter of policy and practice, and despite the effort of Black leadership to overcome that discrimination. The National Association for the Advancement of Colored People (NAACP) had been formed in 1909 to move Black equality of opportunity forward, but with the declaration of war in 1917 civil rights leader W.E.B. Du Bois declared an acceptable fall-back in the effort. "First your country, then your rights!" became the NAACP slogan.

The optimistic belief was that by serving valiantly in the nation's war effort Blacks would gain the respect and equality that had been elusive thus far. But it was pitted against an underlying unwillingness by the War Department to become a vehicle for social change. Secretary of War Newton D. Baker had made it clear that, though African Americans would be fairly treated in the military, the department could not "undertake at this time to settle the so-called race question." Instead, the practices that limited equality and opportunity in civilian society were carried over to military society.

Prospective Black enlistees in the war effort were turned away, in large part because there were not enough segregated Black units to take them in. Those Blacks who were successfully enlisted were kept in the same restricted channels of their civil lives. Segregated transportation took them to segregated military bases and regiments that were rarely deployed to much more than the tasks of support and maintenance. And in those jobs they were subject to treatment of indignities by white officers such as eating in the rain, having no facilities to wash clothes or bath, no toilets and sleeping in tents with no floors. Still, many African Americans volunteered to join the military following America's entry into the war. By the time of the armistice with Germany on November 11, 1918, over 200,000 African Americans had served with the American Expeditionary Force on the Western Front, while 170,000 remained in the United States.

Though most African-American units were largely relegated to support roles and did not see combat, some African Americans played a notable role in America's war effort. For example, the 369th Infantry Regiment, known as the "Harlem Hellfighters", was assigned to the French Army and served on the front lines for six months. 171 members of the 369th were awarded the Legion of Merit.

Germany attempted to sway the African American troops with propaganda challenging their race-related rights back in the United States.

Corporal Freddie Stowers of the 371st Infantry Regiment that was seconded to the 157th French Army division called the Red Hand Division in need of reinforcement under the command of the General Mariano Goybet was posthumously awarded a Medal of Honor—the only African American to be so honored for actions in World War I. During action in France, Stowers had led an assault on German trenches, continuing to lead and encourage his men even after being twice wounded. Stowers died from his wounds, but his men continued the fight and eventually defeated the German troops. Stowers was recommended for the Medal of Honor shortly after his death, but the nomination was, according to the Army, misplaced. In 1990, under pressure from Congress, the Department of the Army launched an investigation. Based on findings from this investigation, the Army Decorations Board approved the award of the Medal of Honor to Stowers. On April 24, 1991–73 years after he was killed in action—Stowers' two surviving sisters received the Medal of Honor from President George H. W. Bush at the White House. The success of the investigation leading to Stowers' Medal of Honor later sparked a similar review that resulted in six African Americans being posthumously awarded the Medal of Honor for actions in World War II. Vernon Baker was the only recipient who was still alive to receive his award.

Units 
Some of the African-American units that served in World War I were:

 92nd Infantry Division
 366th Infantry Regiment
 93rd Infantry Division
 369th Infantry Regiment ("Harlem Hellfighters"; formerly the 15th New York National Guard)
 370th Infantry Regiment ("Black Devils", formerly the 8th Illinois)
 371st Infantry Regiment
 372nd Infantry Regiment

Support units included:
 Butchery Companies, Nos. 322 and 363
 Stevedore Regiments, Nos. 301, 302 and 303d Stevedore Regiment and Stevedore Battalions, Nos. 701, 702
 Army Corps of Engineers: Engineers Service Battalions, Nos. 505 to 567, inclusive (but skipping 531–532, 538, 537–563) (57 total; about 1008 personnel per battalion)
 Labor Battalions, Nos. 304 to 315, inclusive; Nos. 317 to 327, inclusive; Nos. 329 to 348, inclusive, and No. 357
 Labor Companies, Nos. 301 to 324, inclusive
 Pioneer Infantry Battalions, Nos. 801 to 809, inclusive; No. 811 and Nos. 813 to 816, inclusive.

A complete list of African-American units that served in the war is available.

African Americans Veterans faced heavy persecution when they returned home from World War I and many African American veterans were lynched after returning from WWI. The prediction of equality by W.E.B. Du Bois and the NAACP would not be realized, and racial antagonism was expanded by the claims that any talk of Black valor and positive contribution were lies meant to cover up cowardice and incompetence, which was counteracted by claims of prejudiced and harmful white leadership and the use of Blacks as cannon fodder for white troops that followed them into combat.

Experience of Soldiers in France 
African Americans were typically placed into labour battalions with around 160,000 of the 200,000 African Americans who were shipped out to France in 1917 finding themselves placed in one. These labour battalions were viewed as being the "dregs of the military forces" and the men in them were "driven to the brink of physical and emotional exhaustion".  Jim Crow was extended to the camps where the African American soldiers were stationed and white officers would frequently remind African American soldiers of this. The 370th Infantry Regiment were informed a black member of a labour battalion had recently been hanged in the same square the unit was now assembling in a small town outside the Lorraine region.

In support of an attempt to impose American racial policy on France, U.S. military authorities sent a memo to the mayors of the Meuse division upon the arrival of the African American 372nd Infantry Regiment (The "Red Hand") in 1918. It asked that the French not integrate the Black troops into French society:

The request was generally disregarded by the French.

The way they were treated by white Americans in France differed markedly from the way they were treated by French troops and civilians who dealt with them roughly as equals. This left the African Americans disillusioned.

African American soldiers interacted with colonial troops stationed in France, and they had already read about them in African American newspapers. The French military had reframed the debate for African Americans at home, in that France recognized that Blacks had an "important combatant role in the defence of the nation". These stories and experiences fuelled African American racial pride which contributed to their mass disillusionment when they returned  home.

YMCA services in France were also segregated sixty African American y-secretaries, among them twenty-three African American women served the 200,000 black soldiers stationed in France, only three of these arrived before the armistice – including Addie W. Hunton and Kathryn M. Johnson. The YMCA work provided entertainment, recreation, and education to the vast majority of African American troops as they had more time on their hands since they served in labor battalions.

African American WWI veterans role in the civil rights movement:

According to the historian Chad L Williams, "African American soldiers' experiences in the war and their battles with the pervasive racial discrimination in the U.S. military informed their postwar disillusionment and subsequent racial militancy as veterans". Examples of this racial militancy can be seen in the prominent roles which some African American WWI veterans played in the civil rights movement. For example, William N. Colston, an African American veteran who had served in the 367th infantry during the war, published several essays in the US's leading radical African American magazine- the Messenger. These articles aimed to illustrate the experiences which African Americans soldiers had throughout the war. African American's wartime experiences also played a key role in the formation of the League for Democracy which was a Civil Rights movement formed by African American soldiers serving in the 92nd Division with its key aim being to combat racial discrimination within the military.

Second Italo-Abyssinian War 
On October 4, 1935, Fascist Italy invaded Ethiopia. Being the only non-colonized African country besides Liberia, the invasion of Ethiopia caused a profound response amongst African Americans. In New York City, clashes took place between African Americans and the Italian immigrant community, many of whom vocally supported Mussolini's invasion. A rally held at Madison Square Garden on Sept. 26, less than a week before the invasion, brought out more than 10,000 to hear civil rights leader W.E.B. Du Bois, Paul Robeson and others speak about the impending disaster. Samuel Daniels, head of the Pan-African Reconstruction Association, toured major American cities to recruit volunteers. African Americans organized to raise money for medical supplies, and several thousand volunteered to fight for the African kingdom. Most volunteers were blocked from leaving the United States due to the American government's desire to remain neutral in the conflict.

Volunteer John C. Robinson, a pilot and graduate of Tuskegee University, made his way to Ethiopia to assist with training pilots for Ethiopia's new air force. Ethiopian Emperor Haile Selassie soon personally named Robinson commander of the entire air force. Robinson was given the nickname the "Brown Condor" by Ethiopian forces for his service.

Many years later Haile Selassie I would comment on the efforts: "We can never forget the help Ethiopia received from Negro Americans during the crisis. ... It moved me to know that Americans of African descent did not abandon their embattled brothers, but stood by us."

Spanish Civil War 
When General Franco rebelled against the newly established secular Spanish Republic, a number of African Americans volunteered to fight for Republican Spain. Many African Americans who were in the Abraham Lincoln Brigade had Communist ideals. Among these, there was Vaughn Love who went to fight for the Spanish loyalist cause because he considered Fascism to be the "enemy of all black aspirations."

African-American activist and World War I veteran Oliver Law, fought in the Abraham Lincoln Brigade during the Spanish Civil War

James Peck was an African-American man from Pennsylvania who was turned down when he applied to become a military pilot in the US. He then went on to serve in the Spanish Republican Air Force until 1938. Peck was credited with shooting down five Aviación Nacional planes, two Heinkel He-51s from the Legion Condor and three Fiat CR.32 Fascist Italian fighters.

Salaria Kea was a young African-American nurse from Harlem Hospital who served as a military nurse with the American Medical Bureau in the Spanish Civil War. She was one of the two only African-American female volunteers in the midst of the war-torn Spanish Republican areas. When Salaria came back from Spain she wrote the pamphlet "A Negro Nurse in Spain" and tried to raise funds for the beleaguered Spanish Republic.

World War II 

The Pittsburgh Courier was one of the most influential African American newspapers of WWII, and the source of what came to be called the Double V Campaign. A letter to the editor of the paper in 1941 asked why a “half American” should sacrifice his life in the war and suggested that Blacks should seek a double victory. “The first V for a victory over our enemies from without, the second V for a victory over our enemies from within.” The idea would become a national cause, and eventually extend into a call for action in the factories and services that supported the war effort.

Despite a high enlistment rate in the U.S. Army, African Americans were still not treated equally. At parades, church services, in transportation and canteens the races were kept separate. A quota of only 48 nurses was set for African-American women, and the women were segregated from white nurses and white soldiers for much of the war. Eventually more black nurses enlisted. They were assigned to care for black soldiers. Black nurses were integrated into everyday life with their white colleagues.

The first African-American woman sworn into the Navy Nurse Corps was Phyllis Mae Dailey, a Columbia University student from New York. She was the first of only four African-American women to serve as a Navy nurse during World War II.

Many black American soldiers served their country with distinction during World War II. There were 125,000 African Americans who were overseas in World War II (6.25% of all abroad soldiers). Famous segregated units, such as the Tuskegee Airmen and 761st Tank Battalion and the lesser-known but equally distinguished 452nd Anti-Aircraft Artillery Battalion, proved their value in combat, leading to desegregation of all U.S. armed forces by order of President Harry S. Truman in July 1948 via Executive Order 9981.

Benjamin O. Davis, Jr. served as commander of the Tuskegee Airmen during the war. He later went on to become the first African-American general in the United States Air Force. His father, Benjamin O. Davis, Sr., had been the first African-American brigadier general in the Army (1940).

Doris Miller, a Navy mess attendant, was the first African-American recipient of the Navy Cross, awarded for his actions during the attack on Pearl Harbor. Miller had voluntarily manned an anti-aircraft gun and fired at the Japanese aircraft, despite having no prior training in the weapon's use.

On April 14, 1943, Joseph C. Jenkins became the first African-American commissioned officer in the United States Coast Guard. He was joined first by Clarence Samuels on August 31, 1943, and then by Harvey C. Russell Jr. in February 1944.

In March 1944, the Golden Thirteen became the Navy's first African-American commissioned officers. Samuel L. Gravely, Jr. became a commissioned officer the same year; he would later be the first African American to command a US warship, and the first to be an admiral.

The Port Chicago disaster on July 17, 1944, was an explosion of about 2,000 tons of ammunition as it was being loaded onto ships by black Navy sailors under pressure from their white officers to hurry. The explosion in Northern California killed 320 military and civilian workers, most of them black. It led a month later to the Port Chicago Mutiny, the only case of a full military trial for mutiny in the history of the U.S. Navy against 50 African-American sailors who refused to continue loading ammunition under the same dangerous conditions. The trial was observed by the then young lawyer Thurgood Marshall and ended in conviction of all of the defendants. The trial was immediately and later criticized for not abiding by the applicable laws on mutiny, and it became influential in the discussion of desegregation.

During World War II, African-American soldiers served in all fields of service, though they were used mostly to support labour. Initially, in Britain, there was a reluctance to accept black American servicemen. President Roosevelt, however, was under an obligation to allow black troops to travel to all theatres of war, and during his re-election in 1940, Roosevelt had relied heavily on the black vote. Eager to meet demands calling for change, including racial integration in the military, Roosevelt seized the opportunity to work towards and end to discrimination in the defense industries and began sending  American servicemen, known as GIs, including African-Americans, to Britain in 1942. In the next three years, approximately 3 million American GIs passed through the country, approximately 8 percent (240,000) being African-American.

In the midst of the Battle of the Bulge in December 1944, General Eisenhower was severely short of replacement troops for existing all-white companies. Consequently, he made the decision to allow 2000 black servicemen volunteers to serve in segregated platoons under the command of white lieutenants to replenish these companies. These platoons would serve with distinction and, according to an Army survey in the summer of 1945, 84% were ranked "very well" and 16% were ranked "fairly well". No black platoon received a ranking of "poor" by those white officers or white soldiers that fought with them. These platoons were often subject to racist treatment by white military units in occupied Germany and were quickly sent back to their old segregated units after the end of hostilities in Germany. Despite their protests, these brave African-American soldiers ended the war in their old non-combat service units. Though largely forgotten after the war, the temporary experiment with black combat troops proved a success - a small, but important step toward permanent integration during the Korean War. A total of 708 African Americans were killed in combat during World War II.

During World War ||, officer training expanded to include African-American Soldiers. Before the U.S. entered the war in 1941, there were only five black officers, which rose to 7,000 by the end of the war. In 1945, Frederick C. Branch became the first African-American United States Marine Corps officer. However, the military remained segregated all through the war, and African-American officers were never allowed to command white troops.

A blue plaque commemorating the contribution of African-American soldiers based in Wales during World War II was installed by the Nubian Jak Community Trust at RAF Carew Cheriton on the 75th anniversary of the D-Day landings, June 6, 2019.

The presence of African-American soldiers in the U.K. and subsequent encounters with the native population has been shown to have reduced the racial prejudice against black people if even decades later, and, for the most part, African American soldiers were more welcome in the countries of European Allies than U.S. officials wished them to be. In the U.K especially, generally all GIs were commended for their generosity and bravery, and in some cases, the British public gained a special affection for African American soldiers that were thought to have better manners than the white Americans. But they were not welcome in some other parts of the world, which became a problem to be solved for Brig. Gen Dwight D. Eisenhower. In 1942, he told the War Department that, by his research, Black troops would not be welcomed for various reasons in Australia, Alaska, most of the south Caribbean nations, the British West Indies, Panama and Liberia. And U.S. military leaders themselves did not want them in Iceland, Greenland, Labrador and the British Isles. The War Department response to the information was mixed, and by 1944 the war had progressed into a need for all troops that could be deployed.
As in World War I, Black soldiers were primarily channeled to support labor, most of them as members of the Quartermaster Corps. Among the most crucial and difficult of Quartermaster responsibilities was burial of the dead and the construction of temporary and permanent cemeteries. The best-known work of the Quartermaster Corps in World War II was the brief Red Ball Express, which ferried food, supplies and fuel along the rapid advance of Allied forces from the Normandy Invasion to the incursion into Germany. Six thousand trucks operating 24 hours a day, most with two African American drivers on circular routes carried 400,000 tons of supplies through increasingly liberated Europe between August 25 and November 16, 1944. The work was relentless, exhausting and dangerous, and credited with helping to bring about the ultimate success of the Normandy Invasion. A 1952 movie, The Red Ball Express, brought more attention to the effort, but underplayed its African American aspect.

Units 

Army:
 92nd Infantry Division
 366th Infantry Regiment
 370th Infantry Regiment
 93rd Infantry Division
 369th Infantry Regiment
 371st Infantry Regiment
 2nd Cavalry Division
 4th Cavalry Brigade
 10th Cavalry Regiment
 27th Cavalry Regiment
 5th Cavalry Brigade 
 9th Cavalry Regiment
 28th Cavalry Regiment
 Non Divisional Units
 Barrage Balloon Unit
 320th Barrage Balloon Battalion
 Anti-Aircraft Artillery Unit
 452nd Anti-Aircraft Artillery Battalion
 Infantry Units
 555th Parachute Infantry Battalion
 Cavalry/Armor Units
 US Military Academy Cavalry Squadron
 5th Reconnaissance Squadron
 758th Tank Battalion
 761st Tank Battalion
 784th Tank Battalion
 Field Artillery Units
 46th Field Artillery Brigade 
 184th Field Artillery Regiment, Illinois National Guard
 333rd Field Artillery Regiment
 349th Field Artillery Regiment 
 350th Field Artillery Regiment 
 351st Field Artillery Regiment 
 353rd Field Artillery Regiment 
 578th Field Artillery Regiment 
 333rd Field Artillery Battalion
 349th Field Artillery Battalion 
 350th Field Artillery Battalion 
 351st Field Artillery Battalion 
 353rd Field Artillery Battalion 
 578th Field Artillery Battalion
 593rd Field Artillery Battalion
 594th Field Artillery Battalion
 595th Field Artillery Battalion
 596th Field Artillery Battalion
 597th Field Artillery Battalion
 598th Field Artillery Battalion 
 599th Field Artillery Battalion
 600th Field Artillery Battalion
 686th Field Artillery Battalion
 777th Field Artillery Battalion
 795th Field Artillery Battalion
 930th Field Artillery Battalion, Illinois National Guard
 931st Field Artillery Battalion, Illinois National Guard
 969th Field Artillery Battalion
 971st Field Artillery Battalion
 973rd Field Artillery Battalion
 993rd Field Artillery Battalion
 999th Field Artillery Battalion
 Tank Destroyer Units
 614th Tank Destroyer Battalion
 646th Tank Destroyer Battalion
 649th Tank Destroyer Battalion
 659th Tank Destroyer Battalion
 669th Tank Destroyer Battalion
 679th Tank Destroyer Battalion
 795th Tank Destroyer Battalion
 827th Tank Destroyer Battalion
 828th Tank Destroyer Battalion
 829th Tank Destroyer Battalion
 846th Tank Destroyer Battalion

Army Air Corps:
 332nd Fighter Group (Tuskegee Airmen)
 477th Bombardment Group
United States Marine Corps
 51st Defense Battalion
 52nd Defense Battalion
 63 USMC Depot and Ammunition Companies were segregated. 
16th Marine Field Depot
7th Marine Depot Company 
11th Marine Ammunition Company

United States Navy
 USS Mason (DE-529) 
 USS PC-1264
 Naval Ordinance Battalions (stevedore)

 United States 
Navy Seabees

 34th Naval Construction Battalion
 80th Naval Construction Battalion
 15 USN Special Construction Battalions (stevedore) were segregated.
 15th Special Naval Construction Battalion 
 17th Special Naval Construction Battalion
 20th Special Naval Construction Battalion 
 21st Special Naval Construction Battalion 
 22nd Special Naval Construction Battalion 
 23rd Special Naval Construction Battalion 
 30th Special Naval Construction Battalion

In February 1942 CNO Admiral Harold Rainsford Stark recommended African Americans for ratings in the construction trades. In April the Navy announced it would enlist African Americans in the Seabees. Even so, there were just two CBs that were "colored" units, the 34th and 80th. Both had white Southern officers and black enlisted. Both battalions experienced problems with that arrangement that led to the replacement of the officers. The men of the 34th went on a hunger strike which made national news. The Commander of the 80th had 19 enlisted dishonorably discharged for sedition. The NAACP and Thurgood Marshall got 14 of those reversed. In 1943 the Navy drew up a proposal to raise the number of colored CBs to 5 and require that all non-rated men in the next 24 CBs be colored. The proposal was approved, but not acted on.

The lack of stevedores in combat zones was a huge issue for the Navy. Authorization for the formation of cargo handling CBs or "Special CBs" happened mid-September 1942. By wars end 41 Special CBs had been commissioned of which 15 were "colored". They were the first fully integrated units in the U.S. Navy. V-J Day brought the decommissioning of all of them.  The Special CBs were forerunners of today's Navy Cargo Handling Battalions of the Navy Expeditionary Logistics Support Group (United States). The arrival of 15 colored Special CBs in Pearl Harbor made segregation an issue for the Navy. For some time the men slept in tents, but the disparity of treatment was obvious even to the Navy. The 14th Naval District felt they deserved proper shelter with at least separate but equal barracks. Manana Barracks and Waiawa Gulch became the United States' largest colored military installation with over 4,000 Seabee stevedores segregated there. It was the site of racial strife to the point that the camp was fenced in and placed under armed guard. The Seabees would be trucked back and forth to the docks in cattle trucks. Two naval supply depots were located at Waiawa Gulch.

Of note were the actions of the 17th Special Naval Construction Battalion and the 16th Marine Field Depot on Peleliu, September 15–18, 1944. On D-Day the 7th Marines were in a situation where there were not enough of them to man the lines and get the wounded to safety. Coming to their aid were the two companies of the 16th Marine Field Depot(segregated) and the 17th Special Seabee (segregated). That night the Japanese mounted a counter-attack at 0200 hours. The Field Depot Marines are recorded as again having humped ammunition, to the front lines on the stretchers they brought the wounded back on and picked up rifles to become infantrymen. By the time it was over nearly the entire 17th CB had volunteered alongside them. The Seabee record states that besides humping ammo and helping wounded they volunteered to man the line where the wounded had been, man 37mm artillery that had lost gun crews and volunteered for anything dangerous. The 17th remained with the 7th Marines until the right flank had been secured D-plus 3.  According to the Military History Encyclopedia on the Web, were it not for the "Black Marine shore party personal" the counterattack on the 7th Marines would not have been repulsed.

On Peleliu, the white shore party detachments from the 33rd and 73rd CBs received Presidential Unit Citations along with the primary shore party, 1st Marine Pioneers.  The Commander of the 17th Special CB (segregated) received the same commendatory letter as the Company Commanders of the 7th Marine Ammo Co. (segregated) and the 11th Marine Depot Co.(segregated).   Before the battle was even over, Major General Rupertus USMC wrote to each that: "THE NEGRO RACE CAN WELL BE PROUD OF THE WORK PREFORMED [by the 11th Marine Depot Company/ 7th Marine Ammunition Company/ 17th CB]. THE WHOLEHEARTED CO-OPERATION AND UNTIRING EFFORTS WHICH DEMONSTRATED IN EVERY RESPECT THAT THEY APPRECIATED THE PRIVILEGE OF WEARING A MARINE UNIFORM AND SERVING WITH THE MARINES IN COMBAT. PLEASE CONVEY TO YOUR COMMAND THESE SENTIMENTS AND  INFORM THEM THAT IN THE EYES OF THE ENTIRE DIVISION THEY HAVE EARNED A "WELL DONE"."  The Department of the Navy made an official press release of a copy of the 17th CB's "Well Done" letter on November 28, 1944.

On Okinawa the 34th CB worked with the 36th CB  constructing Awase Airfield once the rains allowed work to go forward.  The 34th also built the Joint Communications Station at Awase.  Today the Navy maintains a Low Frequency communications station for submarines on the site created by the 34th CB.

 African American Seabees

Medal of Honor recipients 

On January 13, 1997, President Bill Clinton, in a White House ceremony, awarded the nation's highest military honor—the Medal of Honor—to seven African-American servicemen who had served in World War II.

The only living recipient was First Lieutenant Vernon Baker.

The posthumous recipients were:
 Major Charles L. Thomas
 First Lieutenant John R. Fox
 Staff Sergeant Ruben Rivers
 Staff Sergeant Edward A. Carter, Jr. Carter also has a Military Sealift Command vessel named after him.
 Private First Class Willy F. James, Jr.
 Private George Watson

Blue discharges 

African-American troops faced discrimination in the form of the disproportionate issuance of blue discharges. The blue discharge (also called a "blue ticket") was a form of administrative discharge created in 1916 to replace two previous discharge classifications, the administrative discharge without honor and the "unclassified" discharge. It was neither honorable nor dishonorable. Of the 48,603 blue discharges issued by the Army between December 1, 1941, and June 30, 1945, 10,806 were issued to African Americans. This accounts for 22.2% of all blue discharges, when African Americans made up 6.5% of the Army in that time frame. Blue discharge recipients frequently faced difficulties obtaining employment and were routinely denied the benefits of the G. I. Bill by the Veterans Administration (VA). In October 1945, Black-interest newspaper The Pittsburgh Courier launched a crusade against the discharge and its abuses. Calling the discharge "a vicious instrument that should not be perpetrated against the American Soldier", the Courier rebuked the Army for "allowing prejudiced officers to use it as a means of punishing Negro soldiers who do not like specifically unbearable conditions". The Courier printed instructions on how to appeal a blue discharge and warned its readers not to quickly accept a blue ticket out of the service because of the negative effect it would likely have on their lives.

The House Committee on Military Affairs held hearings in response to the press crusade, issuing a report in 1946 that sharply criticized its use and the VA for discriminating against blue discharge holders. Congress discontinued the blue discharge in 1947, but the VA continued its practice of denying G. I. Bill benefits to blue-tickets.

Integration of the armed forces 
On July 26, 1948, President Harry S. Truman signed Executive Order 9981 integrating the military and mandating equality of treatment and opportunity. It also made it illegal, per military law, to make a racist remark. Desegregation of the military was not complete for several years, and all-black Army units persisted well into the Korean War. The last all-black unit was not disbanded until 1954.

In 1950, Lieutenant Leon Gilbert of the still-segregated 24th Infantry Regiment was court martialed and sentenced to death for refusing to obey the orders of a white officer while serving in the Korean War. Gilbert maintained that the orders would have meant certain death for himself and the men in his command. The case led to worldwide protests and increased attention to segregation and racism in the U.S. military. Gilbert's sentence was commuted to twenty and later seventeen years of imprisonment; he served five years and was released.

The integration commanded by Truman's 1948 Executive Order extended to schools and neighborhoods as well as military units. Fifteen years after the Executive Order, Secretary of Defense Robert McNamara issued Department of Defense Directive 5120.36. "Every military commander", the Directive mandates, "has the responsibility to oppose discriminatory practices affecting his men and their dependents and to foster equal opportunity for them, not only in areas under his immediate control, but also in nearby communities where they may gather in off-duty hours." While the directive was issued in 1963, it was not until 1967 that the first non-military establishment was declared off-limits. In 1970 the requirement that commanding officers first obtain permission from the Secretary of Defense was lifted, and areas were allowed to be declared housing areas off limits to military personnel by their commanding officer.

Since the end of military segregation and the creation of an all-volunteer army, the American military saw the representation of African Americans in its ranks rise dramatically.

Korean War 

Jesse L. Brown became the U.S. Navy's first black aviator in October 1948. He died when his plane was shot down during the Battle of Chosin Reservoir in North Korea. He was unable to parachute from his crippled F4U Corsair and crash-landed successfully. His injuries and damage to his aircraft prevented him from leaving the plane. A white squadron mate, Thomas Hudner, crash-landed his F4U Corsair near Brown and attempted to extricate Brown but could not and Brown died of his injuries. Hudner was awarded the Medal of Honor for his efforts. The U.S. Navy honored Jesse Brown by naming a frigate after him—the USS Jesse L. Brown (FF-1089).

James H. Harvey (born July 13, 1923) became the U.S. Air Force's first African-American jet fighter pilot to engage in combat during the Korean War.

Two enlisted men from the 24th Infantry Regiment (still a segregated unit), Cornelius H. Charlton and William Thompson, posthumously received the Medal of Honor for actions during the war.

U.S President Harry Truman issued the order to desegregate the armed forces on July 26, 1948. Truman believed that passing this order would help end racial discrimination. In 1950, North Korea invaded South Korea and the United States entered to war. African American troops composed part of the task force.

On November 24, 1950, 300,000 Chinese troops stormed across the Yalu River, and the majority black 503rd Battalion found themselves directly in the line of fire. The ill-equipped unit lost the battle and many soldiers were killed or taken prisoner by the Chinese. The conditions in these prisons were cold with not enough food. The African American soldiers spent up to three years in the prisons. The Chinese captors believed that African Americans were particularly vulnerable to anti-American propaganda because of the discrimination they faced back home and in their units. As a result, the Chinese subjected African Americans to anti-capitalist and anti-imperial brainwashing more than their white counterparts.

About 600,000 African Americans served in the armed forces during the war and 5,000 died in combat. Many were awarded the Distinguished Service Cross, Silver Star, and Bronze Star.

Vietnam War 

The Vietnam War saw many great accomplishments by many African Americans, including twenty who received the Medal of Honor for their actions. African Americans were over-represented in hazardous duty and combat roles during the conflict, and suffered disproportionately higher casualty rates. Civil-rights leaders protested this disparity during the early years of the war, prompting reforms that were implemented in 1967–68 resulting in the casualty rate dropping to slightly higher than their percentage of the total population.

In 1967, President Lyndon B. Johnson presented the Medal of Honor to U.S. Army Specialist Five Lawrence Joel, for a "very special kind of courage—the unarmed heroism of compassion and service to others." Joel was the first living African American to receive the Medal of Honor since the Mexican–American War. He was a medic who in 1965 saved the lives of U.S. troops under ambush in Vietnam and defied direct orders to stay to the ground, walking through Viet Cong gunfire and tending to the troops despite being shot twice himself. The Lawrence Joel Veterans Memorial Coliseum in Winston-Salem, North Carolina, is dedicated to his honor.

On August 21, 1968, with the posthumous award of the Medal of Honor, U.S. Marine James Anderson, Jr. became the first African-American U.S. Marine recipient of the Medal of Honor for his heroic actions and sacrifice of life.

On December 10, 1968, U.S. Army Captain Riley Leroy Pitts became the first African-American commissioned officer to be awarded the Medal of Honor. His medal was presented posthumously to his wife, Eula Pitts, by President Lyndon B. Johnson.

Three out of the 21 African-American Medal of Honor recipients who served in Vietnam were members of the 5th Special Forces Group otherwise known as The Green Berets. These men are as follows: Sergeant First Class Melvin Morris, SFC. Eugene Ashley, Jr., and SFC. William Maud Bryant.

Melvin Morris received the Medal of Honor 44 years after the action in which he earned the Distinguished Service Cross. Sergeant Ashley's medal was posthumously awarded to his family at the White House by Vice President Spiro T. Agnew on December 2, 1969.

Post-Vietnam to present day 

In 1989, President George H. W. Bush appointed Army General Colin Powell to the position of Chairman of the Joint Chiefs of Staff, making Powell the highest-ranking officer in the United States military. Powell was the first, and is so far the only, African American to hold that position. The Chairman serves as the chief military adviser to the President and the Secretary of Defense. During his tenure Powell oversaw the 1989 United States invasion of Panama to oust General Manuel Noriega and the 1990 to 1991 Gulf War against Iraq. General Powell's four-year term as Chairman ended in 1993.

General William E. "Kip" Ward was officially nominated as the first commander of the new United States Africa Command on July 10, 2007, and assumed command on October 1, 2007.

Ronald L. Green, former Sergeant Major of the Marine Corps, is African-American.

On January 20, 2009, Barack Obama was inaugurated as President of the United States, making him ex officio the first African-American Commander-in-Chief of the United States Armed Forces.

On August 6, 2020, Charles Q. Brown Jr. became the first African-American chief of a United States military service branch, when he took over as Chief of Staff of the Air Force.

On January 22, 2021, Lloyd Austin became the first African-American Secretary of Defense.

Military history of African Americans in popular culture 

The following is a list of notable African-American military members or units in popular culture.

See also 

 African-American mutinies in the United States Armed Forces
 Afro-Asian
 Military history of the United States
 United States Colored Troops
 List of African American Medal of Honor recipients
 Frederick C. Branch
 Benjamin O. Davis
 Martin Delany
 Daniel "Chappie" James, Jr.
 National Association for Black Veterans
 List of African-American astronauts
 African-American discrimination in the U.S. Military
 Racial segregation in the United States Armed Forces
 Hispanics in the United States Marine Corps

Notes

References 
 Bérubé, Allan (1990). Coming Out Under Fire: The History of Gay Men and Women in World War Two. New York, The Penguin Group.  (Plume edition 1991).

 Jones, Major Bradley K. (January 1973). "The Gravity of Administrative Discharges: A Legal and Empirical Evaluation" The Military Law Review 59:1–26.
 McGuire, Phillip (ed.) (1993). Taps for a Jim Crow Army: Letters from Black Soldiers in World War II. University Press of Kentucky. .
 Morriss, Roger (1997). Cockburn and the British Navy in Transition: Admiral Sir George Cockburn, 1772–1853. Columbia, South Carolina: University of South Carolina Press. 
 Shilts, Randy (1993). Conduct Unbecoming: Gays & Lesbians in the U.S. Military Vietnam to the Persian Gulf. New York, St. Martin's Press.

Further reading 
 
 
 
 
 
 Dickon, Chris, and Kirkels, Mieke. (2020). Dutch Children of African American Liberators: Race, Military Policy and Identity in World War II and Beyond. United States: McFarland, Incorporated, Publishers.
 Dixon, Chris (2018). African Americans and the Pacific War, 1941–1945: Race, Nationality, and the Fight for Freedom. Cambridge University Press.
 
 
 
 
 Knauer, Christine (2014). Let Us Fight as Free Men: Black Soldiers and Civil Rights. Philadelphia: University of Pennsylvania Press.
 
 
 
 
 Sutherland, Jonatha. (2004). African Americans at War: An Encyclopedia. Santa Barbara, California: ABC-CLIO. 
 White, Steven (2019). World War II and American Racial Politics: Public Opinion, the Presidency, and Civil Rights Advocacy. Cambridge University Press.

 Navy specific 
 Aptheker, Herbert. "The Negro in the Union Navy". Journal of Negro History (1947): 169–200.  .
 Bennett, Michael J. Union Jacks: Yankee Sailors in the Civil War: Yankee Sailors in the Civil War (University of North Carolina Press, 2005)
 Bureau of Naval Personnel. The Negro in the Navy in World War II . Washington, 1947. 103 pp.
 Davis, Michael Shawn. "Many of Them Are Among My Best Men": The United States Navy Looks at Its African American Crewmen, 1755–1955. PhD dissertation, Kansas State University (2011). With detailed bibliography, pp. 216–241.
 Jackson, Luther P. "Virginia Negro Soldiers and Seamen in the American Revolution". Journal of Negro History (1942): 247–287.  .
 Langley, Harold D. "The Negro in the Navy and Merchant Service—1789–1860 1798". Journal of Negro History (1967): 273–286. . .
 
 Miller, Richard E. "The Golden Fourteen, Plus: Black Navy Women in World War One". Minerva: A Quarterly Report on Women and the Military 8.3&4 (1995): 7–13.
Nelson, Dennis D. The Integration of the Negro into the U.S. Navy, 1776–1947 (NY: Farrar Straus, 1951)
 Ramold, Steven J. Slaves, Sailors, Citizens: African Americans in the Union Navy (2002)
 Reddick, Lawrence D. "The Negro in the United States Navy During World War II". Journal of Negro History (1947): 201–219. 
 Schneller, Robert J. Jr. Blue & Gold and Black: Racial Integration of the U.S. Naval Academy (Texas A&M University Press, 2008)
 Sharp, John G. M., The Recruitment of African Americans in the U.S. Navy 1839, Naval History and Heritage Command, 2019.https://www.history.navy.mil/research/library/online-reading-room/title-list-alphabetically/r/the-recruitment-of-african-americans-in-the-us-navy-1839.html  Retrieved March 6, 2019.
 Valuska, David L. The African American in the Union Navy, 1861–1865 (Garland Pub., 1993)
 Williams, Charles Hughes III. "We Have ... Kept the Negroes' Goodwill and Sent Them Away": Black Sailors, White Dominion in the New Navy, 1893–1942, PhD Dissertation. Texas A&M University, 2008.

External links 

 McDaniels III, Pellom: African American Soldiers (USA), in: 1914–1918 online. International Encyclopedia of the First World War.
 Sheffer, Debra J.: Racism in the Armed Forces (USA), in: 1914–1918 online. International Encyclopedia of the First World War.
 
 
 
 
 
 Black Confederates documentary book
 
 
 
 First Kansas Colored Infantry flag, Civil War, Kansas Museum of History
 The "Colored" Soldiers, Kansas Historical Society
 
 

 
Articles containing video clips
History of racial segregation in the United States
Seabees